Tru Calling is an American supernatural drama television series that aired on Fox. Original episodes aired between October 30, 2003, and April 21, 2005; however, the final episode was shown in other territories before it was aired in the United States due to lower-than-anticipated ratings.

The show starred Eliza Dushku as Tru Davies, a twenty-two-year-old medical school student who takes a job at the city morgue when her internship falls through. When the corpse of a deceased woman seems to awaken and asks for her help, Tru discovers that she has the incredible power to relive that day in order to try to prevent that death. Over the course of the series, Tru struggles to keep her secret, juggle her responsibilities with her complicated personal life, and learn to control her power.

Created by Jon Harmon Feldman, the show was produced by Original Film, Oh That Gus!, Inc., and 20th Century Fox Television.

Series overview 

Tru is aided by her boss, Davis (Zach Galifianakis), who acts as a sort of guide and mentor, who is later revealed to have known about Tru's mother (who was, apparently, the last person to receive the "calling" before her daughter), her best friend Lindsey (A.J. Cook), who doesn't know Tru's secret, and her impulsive, good-natured and bumbling younger brother Harrison (Shawn Reaves). Tru keeps her secret from her boyfriends, as well as her sister Meredith (Jessica Collins), who has a drug problem.

Halfway through the first season, Tru's life gets much more complicated when she meets Jack Harper (Jason Priestley), a man who shares Tru's abilities but who works to preserve what he sees as the hand of Fate by ensuring that the people Tru tries to help stay dead, though the series was canceled before the conclusion of their struggle was written. In the first-season finale, it is revealed that Tru's father knows Jack Harper and that he had played a similarly antagonistic role versus Tru's mother, terminating her by hiring a hitman to kill her, though neither Harrison nor Tru found out.

The second season does not feature Tru's best friend Lindsey nor her sister Meredith, whose characters are not mentioned. This season has Tru juggling medical school and her live-saving ability, while Jack aims to foil her attempts at every turn.

Cast and characters

Main 

 Eliza Dushku as Tru Davies
 Shawn Reaves as Harrison Davies
 Zach Galifianakis as Davis
 A.J. Cook as Lindsey Walker (season 1)
 Matt Bomer as Luc Johnston (season 1)
 Jessica Collins as Meredith Davies (season 1)
 Benjamín Benítez as Gardez (season 1)
 Jason Priestley as Jack Harper

Recurring 
 Liz Vassey as Dr. Carrie Allen (season 2)
 Cotter Smith as Richard Davies (season 2)
 Eric Christian Olsen as Jensen Ritchie (season 2)
 Lizzy Caplan as Avery Bishop (season 2)
 Parry Shen as Tyler Li (season 2)

Episodes

Season 1 (2003–04)

Season 2 (2005)

Cancellation 
The series was canceled in 2005 due to low ratings. The final episode aired in many other territories before it screened in the U.S. The cancellation ended the series with multiple unresolved cliffhangers:
Tru's season two romantic interest, a fellow medical student named Jensen, begins to remember reliving an occurrence he and Tru had together from the negated timeline where he was killed, causing him to obsess over death. 
Although initially highly antagonistic to Jack, Tru invites him to a Christmas party with her, hinting he may in time become an ally against her father, Richard. 
Dr. Carrie Allen, the new psychologist at the morgue, who is revealed as an agent of Jack's working to seduce and subvert Davis, learns the truth about Tru's power to rewind from Davis; Davis has yet to tell Tru about this.
Jack, talking to Tru's father, hints he is still intent on killing Jensen, despite having failed to seal his fated death in a previous episode.

Russian adaptation 
The series has been adapted in Russia using the title Я отменяю смерть, pronounced as “Ja otmenjaju smertj′”, and translated to I Revoke the Death, premiering in the country on TV-3 on October 9, 2012.

Broadcast 
The series completed airing in its entirety in New Zealand first. The second season began airing in the country on TV3 on February 4, 2005, with the final episode shown on March 11, 2005. After nearly a year-long hiatus in the U.S., new episodes began on Fox on March 31, 2005. However, the series was pulled again in favour of Fox's new show Point Pleasant and the final episode was screened in many other territories before it finally aired in the U.S. on January 21, 2008 on Syfy.

The complete series also aired in Argentina, Australia, Brazil, Bulgaria, Chile, Colombia, Croatia, Czech Republic, Denmark, France, Germany, Greece, Hong Kong, Hungary, Iceland, India, Ireland, Israel, Italy, Japan, Malaysia, Pakistan, Portugal, Singapore, Slovakia and the United Kingdom.

Home media

Reception

U.S. Nielsen ratings 

Notes
Each U.S. network television season begins in late September and ends in late May, which coincides with the completion of May sweeps.

Awards and nominations

References

External links

 
 

2000s American drama television series
2000s American supernatural television series
2000s American time travel television series
2003 American television series debuts
2005 American television series endings
English-language television shows
Fox Broadcasting Company original programming
Television series about multiple time paths
Television series by 20th Century Fox Television
Television shows filmed in Vancouver
Television shows set in Massachusetts